Entangling Love in Shanghai is a 2010 Chinese television series with 40 episodes. It is a remake of the 1997 series Love Is Payable.

Cast
Alyssa Chia as Xiangxue'er
Huang Shao-chi as Bai Lang
Liao Xiaoqin as Bai Ping
Sun Xing as Qiao Xiannong
Gao Xin as Zhang Guiting
Chen Long as Ma Xianliang
Feng Shaofeng as Chen Congming
He Saifei as Hu Ying
Xu Rongzhen as Liao Wanzhen
Yu Hongliang as Han Dong
Xu Qiwen as Yang Ming
Bi Hanwen as Da Mi
Liu Yanyan as Lu Manli

Broadcast

References

2010 Chinese television series debuts
2010 Chinese television series endings
Television shows set in Shanghai
Television series set in the 1930s
Television series set in the 1940s
Mandarin-language television shows
Chinese romance television series